Mahishi is a she-buffalo demoness in Hindu mythology, the sister of Mahishasura.  After her brother was killed by Parvati's aspect as Durga, the shape-shifting Mahishi sought revenge against her and the gods. According to Malayali tradition, Ayyappan, who was born with the powers of Vishnu and Shiva, defeated Mahishi.

Origin 
According to the Sree Bhutanathaupakyanam, the Trimurti, composed of the deities Brahma, Vishnu, and Shiva, manifested itself in a single man known as Dattatreya, the son of a rishi known as Athri and his wife Anasuya. Lakshmi and Parvati, two of the consorts of these deities, manifested themselves as Leela, the daughter of a different rishi, and took on Dattatreya as her husband. When her husband decided to renounce the world, Leela protested, which caused the rishi to curse her to be born as Mahishi, a she-buffalo.

Rebirth 
When Leela passed away, she was reborn as Mahishi. When her brother Mashishasura was slain by Durga, the she-buffalo divinity performed severe austerities to the creator deity Brahma, who granted her desired boon of only being capable of being slain by the son of Vishnu and Shiva. Satisfied by the impossibility of such an event, Mahishi, possessing the prowess of both the goddess of prosperity and power, quickly overran Svarga, taking the throne of Indra for herself and forcing the devas into exile. Brahma arranged for Dattatreya to assume the form of Sundara Mahisha, a handsome bovine, who was able to enchant the lovestruck Mahishi enough to lead her away from heaven to the forests of earth. After the events of the Samudra Manthana, Shiva was enraptured by the beauty of Mohini, the female avatar of Vishnu, and the two engaged in intercourse. The child who was born from their union was Ayyappan, the one destined to slay Mahishi.  When the latter sought vengeance upon the devas, she recruited the help of the asuras and multiplied into various copies of herself to storm Svarga. The devas beseeched Ayyappan to assist them in defeating her, and the child god ascended to heaven and caught the demoness by her horns and hurled her back to earth for her to die.

References

Shapeshifting
Water buffalo
Demonesses in Hinduism